AS Auteuil is a New Caledonian football team playing at the second level New Caledonia Second Level. It is based in Dumbéa.

Achievements
New Caledonia Cup: 
 0–1 (aet) in Final 1999 vs JS Traput

References
 
 

Football clubs in New Caledonia